Pampered Menial is the debut album by American progressive rock/AOR band Pavlov's Dog, released in 1975.

The album features a line-up comprising David Surkamp, Steve Scorfina, Mike Safron, Rick Stockton, David Hamilton, Doug Rayburn and Siegfried Carver (born Richard Nadler). Carver left the band soon after the album was released. It was first released on ABC Records, debuting on the charts in early April. The LP was soon reissued by Columbia Records, whose version (with slightly different cover) entered the charts in mid-June, just after the ABC issue had dropped off the charts. Having both versions on sale in stores at nearly the same time may have confused buyers.

In the Q & Mojo Classic Special Edition Pink Floyd & the Story of Prog Rock, the album came number 26 in its list of "40 Cosmic Rock Albums".

Track listing
All tracks credited to David Surkamp, except where noted. All information according to original vinyl liner notes.

Charts

Personnel
Pavlov's Dog
David Surkamp: vocals, rhythm guitar
Steve Scorfina: lead guitar
David Hamilton: organ, piano, synthesizer
Doug Rayburn: mellotron, flute
Siegfried Carver: violin, viola, Vitar
Rick Stockton: bass guitar
Mike Safron: drums, percussion

Production
Tim Geelan: recording engineer
Lou Schlossberg: recorder
Ed Sprigg: mixing engineer
Howie Lindeman: mixing tape engineer

References

1975 debut albums
Pavlov's Dog (band) albums
Albums produced by Murray Krugman
Albums produced by Sandy Pearlman
ABC Records albums
Columbia Records albums